45 Years Of Memories features new recordings of audience favorites by the progressive bluegrass band The Country Gentlemen. Credited to "Charlie Waller & The Country Gentlemen," it features Waller showcases from all eras of band, the earliest song dating from 1961.

Track listing

Personnel

The Country Gentlemen
 Charlie Waller – guitar, vocals
 Dan Auldridge – mandolin
 Greg Corbett – banjo
 Ronnie Davis – bass

Additional Musicians
 Greg Luck – guitar, fiddle
 Rob Ickes – Dobro

References

The Country Gentlemen albums
2002 albums